Scopula rufisalsa is a moth of the  family Geometridae. It is found in Kenya, South Africa and Zambia.

Subspecies
Scopula rufisalsa rufisalsa (South Africa)
Scopula rufisalsa pallidisalsa Prout, 1932 (Kenya)

References

Moths described in 1897
rufisalsa
Moths of Africa